Lieutenant-Colonel John Jacob Astor V, 1st Baron Astor of Hever, DL (20 May 1886 – 19 July 1971) was an American-born English newspaper proprietor, politician, sportsman, military officer, and a member of the Astor family.

Biography
Astor was born in Manhattan, New York City, in 1886, the fourth child of William Waldorf Astor, 1st Viscount Astor (1848–1919), and Mary Dahlgren Paul (1858–1894). He was five years old when his family left New York to live in England. He was raised on an estate purchased by his father at Cliveden-on-Thames in Buckinghamshire and was educated at Eton College and at New College, Oxford. Upon his father's death in 1919, Astor inherited Hever Castle, near Edenbridge, Kent, where he lived the life of an English country gentleman.

Olympic Games

Astor represented Great Britain in rackets at the 1908 Summer Olympics, winning the gold medal in the men's doubles competition together with Vane Pennell, and winning bronze in the men's singles event.

Astor had been the British Public Schools rackets champion in 1904–1905, and in the same year as his Olympic competition he played singles and doubles in the British Army rackets championships.

Despite the later loss of a leg, he was able to play and win against younger opponents at squash on a prosthetic limb.

Military service
He served in the 1st Life Guards, which he joined in 1906 after a year at Oxford, and was Aide-de-Camp to Baron Hardinge, Viceroy of India between 1911 and 1914.  Within his regiment he was promoted Captain in 1913 and Major in 1920.

In World War I, he was wounded serving with his regiment at Messines in October 1914.  After recovering he returned to the Western Front, rising to the rank of Lieutenant-Colonel commanding 520 Household Siege Battery of the Royal Garrison Artillery and awarded the Légion d'Honneur as a Chevalier. In September 1918, near Cambrai, his right leg was shattered by a shell and later amputated.

He was Honorary Colonel of the Kent and Sussex Heavy Regiment, Royal Artillery, between 1927 and 1946 and Honorary Colonel of the 23rd London Regiment, between 1928 and 1949.  In World War II he was Lieutenant-Colonel of the 5th Battalion, City of London Home Guard, a unit drawn from newspaper employees, between 1940 and 1944.

Marriage and children
Astor married Lady Violet Mary Elliot-Murray-Kynynmound (28 May 1889 - 3 January 1965) on 28 August 1916.  She was the third daughter of Gilbert Elliot-Murray-Kynynmound, 4th Earl of Minto and his wife Lady Mary Caroline Grey.  From her previous marriage to Major Lord Charles George Francis Mercer Nairne Petty-Fitzmaurice, who was killed in action at Ypres in 1914, Lady Violet had two children, Margaret and George.

Lord and Lady Astor had three sons:

 Gavin Astor, 2nd Baron Astor of Hever (1 June 1918 - 28 June 1984), married Lady Irene Haig, youngest daughter of Douglas Haig, 1st Earl Haig, and Dorothy Maud Vivian, and had five children including John Jacob "Johnny" Astor VIII.
 Lt Col Hugh Waldorf Astor (20 November 1920 - 7 June 1999), married Emily Lucy Kinloch, a niece of Diana Vreeland, and had five children.
John Astor (26 September 1923 - 27 December 1987), married Diana Kathleen Drummond, a grandniece of Herbert Samuel Holt, and had three children.

Career
He was a director of the Great Western Railway between 1929 and 1946. In 1926, Astor was Lieutenant of the City of London, then held the offices of Justice of the Peace from 1929 and Deputy Lieutenant of Kent from 1936 until 1962. He was a director of Hambros Bank between 1934 and 1960. He was Vice-Chairman of Phoenix Insurance between 1941 and 1952 and Chairman of between 1952 and 1958. He was a director of Barclays Bank between 1942 and 1952. 

In 1922, he purchased The Times newspaper following the death of its owner, Alfred Harmsworth, 1st Viscount Northcliffe. During his tenure as head of The Times, Lord Astor had the newspaper sponsor Edmund Hillary's expedition that made the first successful climb to the summit of Mount Everest. Astor remained chairman of the paper until 1959 when his son Gavin took over. In 1966, The Times was sold to Canadian newspaper tycoon, Roy Thomson.

Astor served as the first chairman of the General Council of the Press, which was established in 1953. He resigned from the position in April 1955 due to ill-health.

In addition to his newspaper business, John Jacob V served in politics, as Alderman of the London County Council between 1922 and 1925, and in the Parliament of the United Kingdom for 23 years as Unionist Member of Parliament (MP) for Dover from 1922 to 1945. On 21 January 1956 he was created Baron Astor of Hever, of Hever Castle in the County of Kent, taking his seat in the House of Lords on 21 March. In 1962, he moved from England to France.

Death
He died on 19 July 1971 in Cannes, France.

Legacy
John Astor was a great benefactor of The Middlesex Hospital, London W 1, both financially and in service given. He was a member of The Board of Governors for 40 years, and Chairman for 24 years.
He endowed the Chair of Physiology in 1920. He gave the money for the Nurses' Home in Foley St, which still stands despite the demolition of the hospital, which closed in 2005. For many years, the name of the donor was unknown, but it was later named John Astor House in his honour. He gave money towards the Windeyer Building of the Medical School, and Astor College, the medical students' residence.

Selected artworks from the family's vast collection were bequeathed to the National Gallery including the prized "Thames below Westminster" by Claude Monet. John Jacob V and Violet are buried together on the grounds of Hever Castle, which, since 1983, has been owned by Broadland Properties Limited and is a major tourist attraction. Eldest son Gavin succeeded him as Baron.

References

External links 

 

profile

1886 births
1971 deaths
Military personnel from New York City
American emigrants to England
Alumni of New College, Oxford
John Jacob
Barons Astor of Hever
British Army personnel of World War I
British Home Guard officers
British Life Guards officers
Conservative Party (UK) MPs for English constituencies
British newspaper publishers (people)
Members of the Parliament of the United Kingdom for Dover
Livingston family
Members of London County Council
People educated at Eton College
Racquets players at the 1908 Summer Olympics
Olympic racquets players of Great Britain
Medalists at the 1908 Summer Olympics
Olympic gold medallists for Great Britain
Olympic bronze medallists for Great Britain
English Olympic medallists
UK MPs 1922–1923
UK MPs 1923–1924
UK MPs 1924–1929
UK MPs 1929–1931
UK MPs 1931–1935
UK MPs 1935–1945
UK MPs who were granted peerages
Racquets players
English cricketers
Buckinghamshire cricketers
Roehampton Trophy
British sportsperson-politicians
Presidents of the Marylebone Cricket Club
Naturalised citizens of the United Kingdom
Politicians from New York City
People from Taplow
St. George's School (Rhode Island) alumni
British amputees
Cricketers from New York City
Hereditary barons created by Elizabeth II
Younger sons of viscounts
People from Hever, Kent